Prantvel is a village in Bayad Taluka in Aravalli district of Gujarat state, India.

Places of interest
On a raised platform near village, three memorial stones, and round the platform thirty or forty graves. The people say that the stones were raised, and are now worshipped, by the wandering tribe of Chamthas.

References

Notes

Bibliography
 This article incorporates text from a publication now in the public domain: 

Villages in Aravalli district